Milan Luhový (born 1 January 1963) is a Slovak former professional footballer who played as a forward for Slovan Bratislava, Dukla Prague, Sporting Gijón, Saint-Étienne, P.A.O.K. and Sint-Truiden. At international level, he made 31 appearances for Czechoslovakia scoring seven goals.

Career
Luhový was born in Ružomberok. He twice won the Czechoslovak Cup, in 1982 with Slovan Bratislava and in 1985 with Dukla Prague. In 1988 and 1989 he became the top goalscorer of the Czechoslovak First League.

Luhový played regularly for the national team in the late 1980s. He appeared as a substitute for the Czechoslovakia national team at 1990 FIFA World Cup, scoring their fifth goal in a 5–1 win over the USA in the first round.

References

External links
 

1963 births
Living people
Sportspeople from Ružomberok
Slovak footballers
Czechoslovak footballers
Czechoslovakia international footballers
1990 FIFA World Cup players
ŠK Slovan Bratislava players
Dukla Prague footballers
Super League Greece players
PAOK FC players
La Liga players
Sporting de Gijón players
AS Saint-Étienne players
Ligue 1 players
Belgian Pro League players
Sint-Truidense V.V. players
Expatriate footballers in Spain
Expatriate footballers in France
Czechoslovak expatriate footballers
Czechoslovak expatriate sportspeople in Spain
Expatriate footballers in Greece
Slovak expatriate sportspeople in Greece
Expatriate footballers in Belgium
Slovak expatriate sportspeople in Belgium
Slovak expatriate footballers
Association football forwards
MŠK Púchov players